The 1980 European Athletics Indoor Championships were held in Sindelfingen, a city in West Germany, on 1 and 2 March 1980. The championships were boycotted by East Germany. The middle-distance races were hand-timed.

The host nation topped the medal table with 12 medals, including 5 golds, followed closely by Poland and the Soviet Union.

Medal summary

Men

Women

Medal table

Participating nations

 (4)
 (11)
 (13)
 (1)
 (9)
 (1)
 (5)
 (14)
 (4)
 (3)
 (11)
 (1)
 (4)
 (15)
 (5)
 (3)
 (21)
 (1)
 (4)
 (29)
 (10)
 (6)
 (8)
 (1)
 (42)
 (8)

References
 Results - men at GBRathletics.com
 Results - women at GBRathletics.com
 The EAA

 
European Athletics Indoor Championships
European Indoor Championships in Athletics
European Indoor Championships in Athletics
International athletics competitions hosted by West Germany
European Indoor Championships in Athletics